SpeXial is Taiwanese Mandopop boyband SpeXial's debut Mandarin studio album produced by Jeremy Ji, a famous Taiwanese Mandopop songwriter. It was released on 7 December 2012. The first promotional single is a lyric song "Celebrate Loneliness" (慶祝寂寞). "Gone Mad" (發飆) - SpeXial version, the theme song of Idol Drama KO one 2, is the second promotional single. The third promotional single is an electronic dance song "Super Style", which is also the theme song of Idol Drama KO One Re-act. This album was funded by “2012 Funding the Production and Marketing of Outstanding Popular Music” of Bureau of Audiovisual and Music Industry Development.

Track listing

Music videos

References

External links
  首張同名專輯「SpeXial」| 華納線上音樂雜誌

2012 debut albums
SpeXial albums